The following is a list of Grammy Awards winners and nominees from France:

References

French

 Grammy
Grammy
Grammy